Philip Kwok (also known as Kuo Chui, Kwok Chui, Kwok Chun-Fung; born 21 October 1951) is a Hong Kong-based Taiwanese actor, martial artist, and stuntman. He rose to fame as a member of the Venom Mob, an ensemble of highly-talented martial arts actors that starred in several films for Shaw Brothers Studio in the 1970s and 1980s.

Filmography

Acting 

Dynamite Brothers (1974) - Tuen's henchman (uncredited)
Na Cha the Great (1974)
Hong hai er (1975) - Blue stone statue
The Four Assassins (1975) - Chen Chieh / Chen Jie
Shen hu (1975)
Zhong yuan biao ju (1976)
Bloody Avengers (1976) – Kung Fu demonstrator / Japanese
Demon Fists of Kung Fu (1976)
Master of the Flying Guillotine (1976)
Savage Killers (1976)
Cai li fa xiao zi (1976)
Shaolin Temple (1976) - Lin Kwong-yao
Yi qi guang gun zou tian ya (1977)
The Naval Commandos (1977)
Magnificent Wanderers (1977) - Wrestler
The Brave Archer (1977) - Zhou Botong
Chinatown Kid (1977) - White Dragon Boss
Life Combat (1978) - Qui Zi Yu
The Brave Archer 2 (1978)
Five Deadly Venoms (1978) - He Yuan-xin, Gecko / Lizard
Invincible Shaolin (1978) - Ho Ying Wu (Fishtail Pole)
Return of the 5 Deadly Venoms (1978) - Chen Shuen
The Kings of Kung Fu (1978) - Leung
Avenging Warriors (1979) - Ying Cha-Po
Za ji wang ming dui (1979) - Liang Kuo-jen
The Magnificent Ruffians (1979) - Yang Zhui Feng
Kid with the Golden Arm (1979) - Agent Hai Tou
Heaven and Hell (1980) - Cheng Tien-Yang
Flag of Iron (1980) - Iron Panther
Killer Army (1980) - Wong Shu
Legend of the Fox (1980)
Ten Tigers of Kwangtung (1980) - Beggar So
Sword Stained with Royal Blood (1981) - Yuan Cheng-chih
Masked Avengers (1981) - Kao Yao / former No. 2
The Brave Archer 3 (1981)
Ninja Kung Fu (1981) - Mao Tin-Yeung
House of Traps (1982) - Zhi Hua - the Black Fox
The Brave Archer and His Mate (1982) - Kuo Tsing
Ode to Gallantry (1982)
The Enchantress (1983)
Holy Flame of the Martial World (1983) - Yama Elder
Demon of the Lute (1983)
Crazy Shaolin Disciples (1985) - Master Kuai
Lady in Black (1987) - Kern
The Big Heat (1988) - Ah Kam
Fatal Love (1988) - Pow
Hero of Tomorrow (1988) – Big B
Legend of the Phoenix (1988) - Jikaku (Kujaku's Father)
Seven Warriors (1989) - Au
In the Line of Duty 6 (1991) - Tam
In the Line of Duty VII (1991) - Chui
The Story of Ricky (1991) - Lin Hung
Hard Boiled (1992) - Mad Dog
The Cat (1992) - Wang Chieh-Mei
Zen of Sword (1993) - God of War
American Shaolin (1994) - Kung Ching, Cab Driver
Shao Lin huo bao bei (1994)
The Phantom Lover (1995)
Tomorrow Never Dies (1997) - General Chang
Color of Pain (2002)
The Eye 2 (2004) - Monk, Buddhist Master

Stunts 
Treasure Hunt (1994) - Action director
From Zero to Hero (1994) - Actioncoordinator
The Phantom Lover (1995) - Stunt coordinator
Tomorrow Never Dies (1997) - Stunt arranger
The Sunshine Cops (1999) - Action choreographer
Double Tap (2000) - Martial arts choreographer
Lavender (2000) - Stunt coordinator
Comic King (2001) - Stunt coordinator
Brotherhood of the Wolf (2001) - Fight choreographer
Samourais (2002) - Fight choreographer
The Touch (2002) - Stunt coordinator
Yellow Dragon (2003) - Action director 
Son of the Dragon (2006) -Action director
Blood Brothers (2007) - Action choreography 
Ballistic (2008) - Action choreographer
Princess and the Seven Kung Fu Masters (2013) - Stunt coordinator
That Demon Within (2014) - Stunt choreographer

See also
Venom Mob

External links

Hong Kong Buddhists
Hong Kong male film actors
1951 births
Living people
Shaw Brothers Studio films
Taiwanese male film actors
Male actors from Taipei